Tuimaleali'ifano is one of the four paramount chiefly titles of Samoa, known as the Tama-a-Aiga ("Sons of the Families"). Samoa's other three paramount chiefs are Malietoa, Mata'afa and Tupua Tamasese. The seat of the Tuimaleali'ifano title is at Falelatai in the Aʻana district.

The current title-holder is Tuimaleali'ifano Va'aletoa Sualauvi II, who has held the title since 1977 and currently serves as O le Ao o le Malo (head of state).

Origins
The title is the most recent of the Tama-a-Aiga, originating in the mid-nineteenth century with Tuiaana Sualauvi, a nephew of Malietoa Fitisemanu I. Sualauvi was appointed Tui A'ana in 1848. By the early 1860s he had also been appointed to the pāpā titles of Gatoaitele and Vaetamasoalii. In 1869, he obtained the support of Fuataga and Tafua of Aleipata and Moeono and Tusa of Falefa and Lufilufi and was appointed Tui Atua, briefly ascending to the position of Tupu Tafa-ifa. His reign however, would only last a year, passing away on 25 August, 1870. After Sualauvi's death his youngest son Fa'aoloi'i succeeded, and was referred to by the name Tuimaleali'ifano, a contraction of Tui, from Tuita'alili, and Leali'ifano, whose origins are disputed. 

Tuimaleali'ifano Fa'aoloi'i Si'ua'ana I lived until 1937, surviving civil war, German colonisation, and New Zealand colonial rule. Following his death the title was disputed, and in 1949 the Land and Titles Court of Samoa ruled that it belonged to the descendants of Tuiaana Sualauvi. The title was again disputed following the death of Tui A'ana Tuimaleali'ifano Suatipatipa II.

Holders
Tuimaleali'ifano Fa'aoloi'i Si'ua'ana I (1871—1937) 
Tuimaleali'ifano Fa'aoloi'i Si'ua'ana II (Si'ua'ana's eldest son, held title for nine months)
Tui A'ana Tuimaleali'ifano Suatipatipa II (1952–1974) (son of Si'ua'ana I)
Tuimaleali'ifano Va'aletoa Sualauvi II (1977–)

References

Samoan chiefs